The Goondiwindi Region is a local government area located in the Darling Downs region of Queensland, Australia along the state's border with New South Wales. Established in 2008, it was preceded by three previous local government areas which dated back to the 19th century.

It has an estimated operating budget of A$26.1 million.

History 
Prior to the 2008 amalgamation, the Goondiwindi Region existed as three distinct local government areas:

 the Town of Goondiwindi;
 the Shire of Waggamba;
 and the Shire of Inglewood.

Inglewood and Waggamba began as two of Queensland's 74 divisions created under the Divisional Boards Act 1879 on 11 November 1879. The Municipality of Goondiwindi was proclaimed under the Local Government Act 1878 on 20 October 1888. They became shires, and a town, respectively on 31 March 1903 under the Local Authorities Act 1902.

In July 2007, the Local Government Reform Commission released its report and recommended that the three areas amalgamate. On 15 March 2008, the Town and Shires formally ceased to exist, and elections were held on the same day to elect councillors and a mayor to the Regional Council.

Wards
The council remains undivided and its elected body consists of six councillors and a mayor.

Mayors 
 2008-2020: Graeme Scheu
 2020–present: Lawrence Springborg

Towns and localities 
The Goondiwindi Region includes the following settlements:

Goondiwindi area:
 Goondiwindi (town)
Other areas:
 Boondandilla (locality)
 Bringalily (locality)
 Canning Creek (locality)
 Cement Mills (locality)
 Goodar (locality)
 Kioma (locality)
 Mungindi (locality) (part)
 North Bungunya (locality)
 North Talwood (locality)
 South Talwood (locality)
 Yagaburne (locality)

Waggamba area:
 Billa Billa (locality)
 Bungunya (town)
 Callandoon (locality)
 Calingunee (locality)
 Daymar (town)
 Kindon (locality)
 Kurumbul (town)
 Lundavra (locality)
 Moonie (locality) (part)
 Talwood (town)
 Tarawera (locality)
 Toobeah (town)
 Weengallon (locality)
 Wondalli (locality)
 Wyaga (locality)
 Yelarbon (town)
 Calingunee State Forest
 Kerimbilla State Forest

Inglewood area:
 Beebo (locality)
 Bonshaw (locality)
 Brush Creek (locality)
 Bybera (locality)
 Coolmunda (locality)
 Glenarbon (locality)
 Gore (town)
 Greenup (locality)
 Inglewood (town)
 Limevale (locality)
 Maidenhead (locality)
 Mosquito Creek (locality)
 Oman Ama (locality)
 Riverton (locality)
 Silver Spur (town)
 Smithlea (locality)
 Terrica (locality)
 Texas (town)
 Warroo (locality)
 Watsons Crossing (locality)
 Whetstone (locality)
 Bringalily State Forest
 Yelarbon State Forest

Libraries
The Goondiwindi Regional Council operate public libraries at Goondiwindi, Inglewood, and Texas.

Population
The populations given relate to the component entities prior to 2008.

References

 
Local government areas of Queensland
Darling Downs
2008 establishments in Australia